Shem HaMephorash ( Šēm hamMəfōrāš, also Shem ha-Mephorash), meaning "the explicit name," is originally a Tannaitic term describing the Tetragrammaton. In Kabbalah, it may refer to a name of God composed of either 4, 12, 22, 42, or 72 letters (or triads of letters), the latter version being the most common.

12-, 22-, and 42-letter names 
Early sources, from the Mishnah to Maimonides, only use "Shem ha-Mephorash" to refer to the four letter Tetragrammaton.

b. Qiddushin 72a describes a 12-letter name (apparently a mundane euphemism, YHWH-EHYH-ADNY or YHWH-YHWH-YHWH) and a 42-letter name (holy but unknown; Hayy Gaon says it is the acronym of the medieval piyyut Ana b'Koach).

Its origins are unknown, with no connection to Hebrew or Aramaic being found, and no agreement on any particular Greek or Zoroastrian origin.

The 72-fold name

In Judaic Kabbalah

The 72-fold name is highly important to Sefer Raziel HaMalakh. It is derived from Exodus 14:19–21, read boustrophedonically to produce 72 names of three letters.  This method was explained by Rashi, (b. Sukkah 45a), as well as in Sefer HaBahir (c. 1150~1200). Kabbalist legends state that the 72-fold name was used by Moses to cross the Red Sea, and that it could grant later holy men the power to cast out demons, heal the sick, prevent natural disasters, and even kill enemies.

According to G. Lloyd Jones,

Liber Semamphoras (aka Semamphoras, Semyforas) is the title of a Latin translation of an occult or magical text of Jewish provenance attributed to Solomon. It was attested in 1260 by Roger Bacon, who complained about the linguistic corruption that had occurred in translating Liber Semamphoras into Latin from Hebrew. It is heavily indebted to Sefer HaRazim through its Latin versions, Liber Sepher Razielis idest Liber Secretorum seu Liber Salomonis, and seemingly replaced the more explicitly magical text Liber magice in the  Razielis.

In Christian Kabbalah
Johann Reuchlin (1455–1522) considered these 72 names, made pronounceable by the addition of suffixes such as 'El' or 'Yah', to be the names of angels, individuated products of God's will. Reuchlin refers to and lists the 72 Angels of the Shem Hamephorash in his 1517 book De Arte Cabbalistica. According to Bernd Roling,

Reuchlin's cosmology in turn influenced Heinrich Cornelius Agrippa (1486–1535) and Athanasius Kircher (1602–1680).

In 1686, Andreas Luppius published Semiphoras und Schemhamphoras, a German translation of the earlier Latin text, Liber Semiphoras (see previous section), which Luppius augmented heavily with passages from Agrippa’s De Occulta Philosophia and other sources.

In Hermetic Qabalah and Goetia
Blaise de Vigenère (1523–1596), following Reuchlin, featured the 72 angels in his writings. De Vigenère's material on the Shemhamphorash was later copied and expanded by Thomas Rudd (1583?–1656), who proposed that it was a key (but often missing) component to the magical practices in the Lesser Key of Solomon, as a balancing force against the evil spirits of the Ars Goetia or in isolation. Skinner and Rankine explain that de Vigenère and Rudd  adopted these triliteral words with '-el' or '-yah' (both Hebrew for "god") added to them as the names of the 72 angels that are able to bind the 72 evil spirits also described in The Lesser Key of Solomon (c. mid-17th century).

Blaise de Vigenère's manuscripts were also used by Samuel Liddell MacGregor Mathers (1854–1918) in his works for the Hermetic Order of the Golden Dawn. Mathers describes the descent of power from Tetragrammaton through 24 thrones of the Elders of the Apocalypse, each with a crown of three rays:

Contemporary books on Hermetic Qabalah which discuss the subject include Lon Milo DuQuette's
The Chicken Qabalah of Rabbi Ben Clifford.

 Reuchlin's angels of the Shem HaMephorash 

In legend and literature
Shem HaMephorash figures in the legend of the golem, an animated anthropomorphic being in Jewish folklore that is created entirely from inanimate matter (usually clay or mud). The earthen figure is then animated by saying the Shem Hamephorash over it. Jorge Luis Borges refers to this legend in his poem The Golem and in his essay The Golem. The Shem haMephorash also appears in Borges' stories Three versions of Judas and The Circular Ruins.

See also
Magic and religion

Notes

 References 
Citations

Works cited

 

 

 
 
 

 

 

 Further reading 
  Book 3, part II, chapter 25 features the seventy two angels of the "Schemhamphorae''."  This was later copied by Francis Barrett in his book The Magus, in Chapter 21.
 
  This pseudepigraphal work features an appendix titled "Semiphoras and Schemhamphoras".
 
  A commentary on the Tarot, Shemhamphorash, and Goetia.
  Refers to and expands upon Kircher's treatment of the 72-fold name (tying each angel to a different language's word for God), particularly in Chapter III.
 . He attempts to connect the Shemhamphorash to the Tarot.
  Discusses a possible relationship between Michelangelo's fresco in the Sistine Chapel and the Shemhamphorash.

External links 

 Jim Cornwell's The Names of God, from The Alpha and the Omega, "Introduction" discusses the material from an Esoteric Christian perspective.

Names of God in Judaism
Hebrew words and phrases